Vembaukum Ramiengar CSI (c. 1826 – 10 May 1887) was an Indian civil servant and administrator who served as the Diwan of Travancore from 1880 to 1887.

Ramiengar was born in 1826 at Vembakkam in Chingleput district and had his education at Madras University. On completion of his education, he was employed as a translator in the Maratha Cutcherry and gradually rose to become Naib Sheristadar and then, Head Sheristadar. He was eventually appointed Sub-Collector in 1861 and then, promoted to Deputy Collector. In 1867, Rama Iengar was nominated to the Madras Legislative Council and served from 1867 to 1879. In 1880, he was appointed Diwan of Travancore and served until 1887. Rama Iengar returned to Madras in 1887 and died on 10 May 1887.

Ramiengar is remembered for his administrative acumen as a civil servant in the Madras Presidency and later, Diwan of Travancore. He was appreciated for his methodical ways. At the same time, Ramiengar was also criticised for favoring Tamil Brahmins in government appointments in Travancore.

Early life
Ramiengar was born in a traditional Vaishnavite Brahmin family of Vembaukum in the then Chingleput district, Madras Presidency. He was the youngest of three sons. Ramiengar's father was a clerk and record-keeper in the service of the British East India Company.

Ramiengar was one of the six students who joined Government High School, Madras, when it was founded in April 1841. During his schooling, Ramiengar developed keen interest in physical science and astronomy and won a scholarship instituted by the Pachaiyappa Charities.

Early career
On conclusion of his education, Ramiengar was appointed as a translator in the Maratha Cutcherry. In September 1850, Ramiengar was made Head Munshi of Nellore. Ramiengar served in Nellore till the beginning of 1854, when he was made Deputy Registrar of the Department of Public Works. From 1855 to 1857, Ramiengar served as the Naib Sheristadar of Nellore. In March 1857, he was appointed Head Sheristadar of Tanjore and served from 1857 to 1859, when he was made Assistant Imam Commissioner. As Assistant Imam Commissioner, he was instrumental in the Revenue Settlement of the olungu areas of the Cauvery Delta.

In June 1860, he was appointed to inquire into the outstanding advances of the mirasdars and contractors who had borrowed money from the Madras government as flood relief funds. Ramiengar performed this task satisfactorily well that he was entrusted with the revenue settlement of the village of Nallatadi in Tanjore district.

Ramiengar was appointed Sub-Collector of Namakkal in the beginning of 1861 and promoted to a First-grade Deputy Collector in May 1861. Ramiengar served in Namakkal from May 1861 to the end of 1864, when hew was appointed Assistant Commissioner of Paper Currency. Ramiengar served for a year as the Assistant Commissioner of Paper Currency and was appointed First Assistant to the Chief Secretary of the Madras Presidency in 1866. In the beginning of 1867, Ramiengar was appointed Superintendent of Stamps at a monthly salary of Rs.1000. The next year, the Government Lord Napier nominated him to the Madras Legislative Council.

Madras Legislative Council
Ramiengar served in the Council starting from 1867 till 1879. He was the first Indian to serve as the official member. In 1871, Ramiengar, as the additional member of the Viceroy's Council to introduce legislations, proposed a bill to remove defects in the Religious Endowments Act of 1863, but this bill was rejected by the Government on the pretext that it was "radically incomplete and would certainly fail to attain its object" Ramiengar also exercised his influence over the municipal and local fund taxation laws passed during the period.

Ramiengar served as the Municipal Commissioner of Madras city for about eight years. He was offered the Acting Presidency by the then Governor of Madras, Sir William Robinson but he declined the offer. He was appointed Inspector-General of Registration in 1875 and participated in the Delhi durbar of 1 January 1877. In 1873, Ramiengar was chosen to go to England to provide evidence before the Parliamentary Finance Committee but he declined. Ramiengar was also appointed at the instance of John Bruce Norton and served as one of the trustees of the Pachaiyappa Charities. It was during Ramiengar's tenure as a trustee that Pachaiyappa's was raised to a Second-Grade College.

As Diwan of Travancore
Ramiengar was appointed Diwan of Travancore by Maharaja Visakham Thirunal in 1880 on his retirement from the Madras Civil Service and served in the princely state for a period of seven years. During his tenure, Ramiengar introduced the Indian Penal Code in Travancore and re-organised the police force of the state. He also increased the power and jurisdiction of the Munsiff Courts in order to reduce the burden on the High Court. He reorganised the revenue system in Travancore by reducing the strength of the employees while increasing their salaries at the same time. Ramiengar's most important act is believed to be the revenue survey and settlement of Travancore.

Ramiengar also introduced intramural labour in jails and remitted several taxes which were a burden on the people. He encouraged indigenous sugar industries and paper and cotton mills and introduced a stamp act in the state. Ramiengar also took steps to improve the irrigation works of Travancore.

On the eve of Ramiengar's retirement, the Maharaja acknowledged Ramiengar's contributions in his speech : "He had, in fact, during the past six years, imparted an impetus to national prosperity, the full force of which remains to be felt".

Later life and death
In 1887, Ramiengar resigned as Diwan and returned to Madras on pension spending his last days in religious study. He suddenly fell ill and died on 10 May 1887.

Legacy
Ramiengar is remembered for pioneering educational reforms in Travancore and revamping the educational and judicial system in the state. He is largely credited with the revenue settlement of Travancore. He is also credited with having introduced numerous reforms in Madras Presidency during his tenure as member of the legislative council.

Ramiengar was fond of reading and he frequently imported books from England and thus, amassed a huge collection which was donated by his wife to the Pachaiyappa College library on his death. Ramiengar was methodical and ordered and was one of the founders of the Madras Cosmopolitan Club of which he served as the first Secretary.

Sir Alexander Arbuthnot, prominent British businessman, administrator and a former Acting-Governor of Madras, was a close friend of Ramiengar and often spoke highly of him. He even said once that he always relied on the integrity and sound principles of the latter.

Criticism
Ramiengar was often criticised for his liberal political views and loyalist tendencies. During his tenure as Dewan of Travancore, Paramesvaran Pillai anonymously published articles on the Dewan in which he launched scathing attacks on the latter's policy of favoring non-Malayalee Brahmins in the administration in place of Malayali people.

Political inclinations
Ramiengar was a loyalist and Anglophile. Chatterjee and Mukhopadhyaya said he was "the first Indian in Madras to keep his house in European style, to teach English and European music to the females of his family, and to invite European gentlemen to parties at his residence".

Honours
In May 1871, Ramiengar was made a Companion of the Order of the Star of India.

Notes

References

Further reading

1826 births
1887 deaths
People of the Kingdom of Travancore
Indian Hindus
Companions of the Order of the Star of India
19th-century Indian people
People from Kanchipuram district